Berks may refer to:

Places
 Berkshire, England
 Berks, Nebraska, United States
 Berks County, Pennsylvania, United States

Other uses 
 Berks (TV series), Filipino television series
 Berks station, a SEPTA station in Philadelphia, Pennsylvania
 Robert Berks (1922–2011), American sculptor and industrial designer

See also

 St. Berks, a BBC children's radio program
 
 Berk (disambiguation)
 Birks (disambiguation)
 Berkes, surname
 Burks (disambiguation)
 Burke's Peerage, British genealogical publisher
 Birk (disambiguation)
 Burk (disambiguation)
 Burke, surname
 Berkshire (disambiguation)